Sayyid Muhammad Abid (also known as Hāji Abid Hussain) (1834–1912) was an Indian Muslim scholar who co-founded Darul Uloom Deoband. He was the Vice Chancellor of Darul Uloom Deoband for three times.

Name and lineage

His ism (given name) was Muhammad Abid. His nasab (patronymic) is: Muhammad Abid ibn Ashiq Ali ibn Qalandar Bakhsh ibn Jan Alam ibn Muhammad Alam ibn Muhammad Jameel ibn Muhammad Ismail ibn Muhammad Ibrahim ibn Sadullah ibn Mahmud Qalandar ibn Sayyid Ahmad ibn Sayyid Farīd ibn Wajīhuddīn ibn Alāuddīn ibn Sayyid Ahmad Kabīr ibn Shihābuddīn ibn Hussain Ali ibn Abd al-Bāsit ibn Abul Abbās ibn Ishaq Andalīb al-Makki ibn Hussain Ali ibn Lutfullah ibn Tājuddīn ibn Hussain ibn Alāuddīn ibn Abi Tālib ibn Nāsir al-Dīn ibn Nizām al-Dīn Hussain ibn Musa ibn Muhammad al-Araj ibn Abi Abdullah Ahmad ibn Musa al-Mubarraqa ibn Muhammad Taqi ibn Musa Ali Raza ibn Musa al-Kadhim ibn Ja'far al-Sadiq ibn Muhammad al-Baqir ibn Zayn al-Abidin ibn Hussain.

Birth and education
Abid Hussain was born in 1834 in Deoband, Mughal India. Aged 7, he studied Quran and Persian language in Deoband. He went to Delhi for higher education. In the meantime, he had to return to Deoband because of his father's health issues. However, his father died a few days later which made him to discontinue his studies. He was authorized in Tasawwuf by Imdadullah Muhajir Makki and Karim Bakhsh Rampuri.

Career
Abid Hussain was one of the founding figures of Darul Uloom Deoband. At first, he differed from the rest of the founding members about the separation of "madrasa" from the Jama Masjid, and opined that the "madrasa" should remain intact in the Jama Masjid. He changed his opinion later and was the second person who laid the foundation of new building of Darul Uloom Deoband, after the first stone was laid by Miyanji Munne Shah.The sale-deed of the land where the new building of Deoband seminary was constructed is named in his favor.

He served the Deoband seminary as vice chancellor for three times. First, from its inception in 1866 to 1867. The second time from 1869 to 1871 and the third time from 1890 to 1892. He was also a member of the first governing body of Darul Uloom Deoband.

Death and legacy
Abid Hussain died in 1912 in Deoband. His disciples include Aziz-ur-Rahman Usmani.

References

Citations

Bibliography

External links
 

1834 births
1912 deaths
Deobandis
Academic staff of Darul Uloom Deoband
People from Deoband
Hanafis
Vice-Chancellors of Darul Uloom Deoband